Glochidion raivavense, also known by its synonym Phyllanthus raivavense or by the local name mahame on the island of Tubuai, is a species of plant in the family Phyllanthaceae. It is endemic to the Austral Islands in French Polynesia, where it is native to the islands of Rurutu, Tubuai, and Raivavae.

References

raivavense
Flora of the Tubuai Islands
Endangered plants
Taxonomy articles created by Polbot